Kenneth Aird (born 13 April 1947, in Glasgow) is a Scottish former footballer, who played for Celtic, St Mirren, St Johnstone, Hearts, Toronto Metros and Arbroath.

References

External links

1947 births
Living people
Footballers from Glasgow
Association football wingers
Scottish footballers
Celtic F.C. players
St Mirren F.C. players
St Johnstone F.C. players
Heart of Midlothian F.C. players
Toronto Blizzard (1971–1984) players
Arbroath F.C. players
Scottish Football League players
North American Soccer League (1968–1984) players
Scottish expatriate footballers
Expatriate soccer players in Canada
Scottish expatriate sportspeople in Canada